The Fauvel AV.10 was a tailless light aircraft built in France by Charles Fauvel.  A two-seater side-by-side and equipped with a 75 hp engine, it first flew in 1935.  Designed by Charles Fauvel, it was his first powered aircraft, designed from the outset as that, to have been realised. In 1936, it had been exhibited at the 25th Salon de L'Aéronautique at the Grand-Palais of Paris. The AV-10 was a one-off design and disappeared in 1940, when it's believed it was taken by German troops.

Specifications

References

1930s French aircraft
Fauvel aircraft
Aircraft first flown in 1935
Single-engined tractor aircraft
Tailless aircraft